Aspra Spitia is a village in the municipality Olympia, eastern Elis, Greece. In 2011 its population was 195. It is situated between the rivers Alfeios and Erymanthos, 4 km northwest of their confluence. It is 2 km west of Tripotamia (Arcadia), 4 km southeast of Vasilaki, 14 km east of Olympia and 30 km east of Pyrgos. Near the village, archeologists have excavated remains of housing from the Neolithic period. The village was affected by the 2007 Greek forest fires.

Population

See also

List of settlements in Elis

References

External links
 Aspra Spitia GTP Travel Pages

Olympia, Greece
Populated places in Elis